Pyrrobutamine is an antihistamine and anticholinergic.

References 

Pyrrolidines
Alkene derivatives
Chloroarenes
H1 receptor antagonists
Muscarinic antagonists